Xenotilapia caudofasciata is a species of cichlid endemic to Lake Tanganyika where it prefers areas with sandy substrates.  This species can reach a length of  TL.  It can also be found in the aquarium trade.

References

External links
 Photograph

caudofasciata
Fish described in 1951
Taxonomy articles created by Polbot
Taxobox binomials not recognized by IUCN